Paul Van Himst (born 2 October 1943) is a Belgian former football player and a football manager who played as a forward, most notably for R.S.C. Anderlecht.

Career
Van Himst was nicknamed Polle Gazon (Polle is Paul in Brussels dialect, and Gazon means lawn in Dutch and French) due to the large number of fouls committed on him. In 1964, he played in the Belgium-Netherlands match alongside 10 Anderlecht players after the substitution of goalkeeper Delhasse by Jean-Marie Trappeniers.

Van Himst won the Belgian championship eight times, all of them with Anderlecht, the club for which he played his first professional season in 1959–60. With Anderlecht, he scored 233 goals in 457 matches (16 seasons). He then played for RWDM (another Brussels club) in 1975–76 and for Eendracht Aalst (then in the second division) in the following season.

Between 1960 and 1974, Van Himst scored 30 goals (in 81 matches) for the Belgian national team. This performance made him Belgium's second top scorer—along with Bernard Voorhoof—and the tenth most capped player for his country. He made his debut on 19 October 1960 in a match against Sweden and he was part of Belgium's team which qualified for the 1970 World Cup. Van Himst then helped Belgium reach third place at the Euro 1972.
As a football manager, Van Himst worked notably for Anderlecht and the national team which he led to the 1994 FIFA World Cup.

Family
His wife, Arlette Neckebroeck, died on 4 December 2013.

Filmography
Escape to Victory (1981) - Michel Fileu - The Players: Belgium
Max (1994) - Himself

Honours and awards 
Van Himst holds the record of most Golden Shoe awards, having won it on four occasions. In November 2003, to celebrate UEFA's Jubilee, he was named the Golden Player of Belgium by the Belgian Football Association as their most outstanding player of the past 50 years.

He has been an ambassador for the Belgian/South-African NGO "Born In Africa" since 2005.

In 2009, Van Himst became honorary citizen of Dilbeek.

Player 
Anderlecht
 Belgian First Division: 1961–62, 1963–64, 1964–65, 1965–66, 1966–67, 1967–68, 1971–72, 1973–74
 Belgian Cup: 1964–65, 1971–72, 1972–73, 1974–75
 Belgian League Cup: 1973, 1974
Tournoi de Paris: 1964, 1966
 Inter-Cities Fairs Cup runner-up: 1969–70

International
 UEFA European Championship third place: 1972

Individual
 Belgian Golden Shoe: 1960, 1961, 1965, 1974
 Belgian First Division top scorer: 1963–64 (26 goals), 1965–66 (25 goals), 1967–68 (20 goals)
 Ballon d'Or: 1964 (5th place), 1965 (4th place)
 Ballon d'Or nominations: 1963, 1966, 1967, 1972
 1966 FIFA World Cup qualification: Group 1 top scorer (5 goals)
 1966–67 European Cup: top scorer (6 goals)
 1969–70 Inter-Cities Fair Cup: top scorer (10 goals)
 Man of the Season (Belgian First Division): 1970–71
 Former Belgium's Most Capped Player: 1973–1989 (81 caps)
 Belgian National Sports Merit Award: 1974
 Belgian Footballer of the 20th Century: 1995
 Planète Foot's 50 of the World's Best Players: 1996
 IFFHS European Player of the Century (39th): 2000
Platina 11 (Best Team in 50 Years of Golden Shoe Winners): 2003
UEFA Golden Player Award: 2003
 The Best Golden Shoe Team Ever: 2011
DH The Best RSC Anderlecht Team Ever: 2020
IFFHS All Time Belgium Dream Team: 2021

Manager 
Anderlecht
 Belgian First Division: 1984–85
 Belgian Super Cup: 1985
 UEFA Cup: 1982–83; runner-up: 1983–84
Jules Pappaert Cup: 1985

Individual
 Belgian Professional Manager of the Year: 1982–83

See also 
List of UEFA Cup winning managers

References

External links

 CV
 UEFA.com – Golden Player of Belgium
 Born In Africa – Ambassador of the NGO
 – Belgium still bow to Van Himst – By Berend Scholten on UEFA.com

1943 births
Living people
1970 FIFA World Cup players
1994 FIFA World Cup managers
Belgian football managers
Belgian Pro League players
Belgium international footballers
Belgium national football team managers
Footballers from Flemish Brabant
People from Sint-Pieters-Leeuw
R.W.D. Molenbeek managers
R.W.D. Molenbeek players
R.S.C. Anderlecht managers
R.S.C. Anderlecht players
S.C. Eendracht Aalst players
UEFA Champions League top scorers
UEFA Cup winning managers
UEFA Euro 1972 players
UEFA Golden Players
Association football forwards
Belgian footballers